The Biblioteca Ambrosiana is a historic library in Milan, Italy, also housing the Pinacoteca Ambrosiana, the Ambrosian art gallery. Named after Ambrose, the patron saint of Milan, it was founded in 1609 by Cardinal Federico Borromeo, whose agents scoured Western Europe and even Greece and Syria for books and manuscripts. Some major acquisitions of complete libraries were the manuscripts of the Benedictine monastery of Bobbio (1606) and the library of the Paduan Vincenzo Pinelli, whose more than 800 manuscripts filled 70 cases when they were sent to Milan and included the famous Iliad, the Ilias Picta.

History 

During Cardinal Borromeo's sojourns in Rome, 1585–95 and 1597–1601, he envisioned developing this library in Milan as one open to scholars and that would serve as a bulwark of Catholic scholarship in the service of the Counter-Reformation against the treatises issuing from Protestant presses. To house the cardinal's 15,000 manuscripts and twice that many printed books, construction began in 1603 under designs and direction of Lelio Buzzi and Francesco Maria Richini. When its first reading room, the Sala Fredericiana, opened to the public on 8 December 1609 it was one of the earliest public libraries. One innovation was that its books were housed in cases ranged along the walls, rather than chained to reading tables, the latter a medieval practice seen still today in the Laurentian Library of Florence. A printing press was attached to the library, and a school for instruction in the classical languages.

Constant acquisitions, soon augmented by bequests, required enlargement of the space. Borromeo intended an academy (which opened in 1625) and a collection of pictures, for which a new building was initiated in 1611–18 to house the Cardinal's paintings and drawings, the nucleus of the Pinacoteca.

Cardinal Borromeo gave his collection of paintings and drawings to the library, too. Shortly after the cardinal's death, his library acquired twelve manuscripts of Leonardo da Vinci, including the Codex Atlanticus. The library now contains some 12,000 drawings by European artists, from the 14th through the 19th centuries, which have come from the collections of a wide range of patrons and artists, academicians, collectors, art dealers, and architects. Prized manuscripts, including the Leonardo codices, were requisitioned by the French during the Napoleonic occupation, and only partly returned after 1815.

On 15 October 1816 the Romantic poet Lord Byron visited the library. He was delighted by the letters between Lucrezia Borgia and Pietro Bembo ("The prettiest love letters in the world") and claimed to have managed to steal a lock of her hair ("the prettiest and fairest imaginable.") held on display.

The novelist Mary Shelley visited the library on 14 September 1840 but was disappointed by the tight security occasioned by the recent attempted theft of "some of the relics of Petrarch" housed there.

Among the 30,000 manuscripts, which range from Greek and Latin to Hebrew, Syriac, Arabic, Ethiopian, Turkish and Persian, is the Muratorian fragment, of ca 170 A.D., the earliest example of a Biblical canon and an original copy of De divina proportione by Luca Pacioli. Among Christian and Islamic Arabic manuscripts are treatises on medicine, a unique 11th-century diwan of poets, and the oldest copy of the Kitab Sibawahaihi.

The library has a college of Doctors, similar to the scriptors of the Vatican Library. Among prominent figures have been Giuseppe Ripamonti, Ludovico Antonio Muratori, Giuseppe Antonio Sassi, Cardinal Angelo Mai and, at the beginning of the 20th century, Antonio Maria Ceriani, Achille Ratti (on 8 November 1888, the future Pope Pius XI, and Giovanni Mercati. Ratti wrote a new edition of the Acta Ecclesiae Mediolanensis ("Acts of the Church of Milan"), Latin work firstly published by the cardinal Federico Borromeo in 1582. 

The building was damaged in World War II, with the loss of the archives of opera libretti of La Scala, but was restored in 1952 and underwent major restorations in 1990–97.

Artwork at the Pinacoteca Ambrosiana includes Leonardo da Vinci's "Portrait of a Musician", Caravaggio's "Basket of Fruit", Bramantino's Adoration of the Christ Child and Raphael's cartoon of "The School of Athens".

Some manuscripts 
 Uncial 0135 — fragments of the gospels of Matthew, Mark and Luke
 Codex Ambrosianus 435, Ambrosianus 837 — treatise On the Soul of Aristotle
 Minuscule manuscripts of New Testament: 343, 344, 345, 346, 347, 348, 349, 350, 351, 352, 353, 614, 615
 Lectionaries ℓ 102, ℓ 103, ℓ 104, ℓ 105, ℓ 106, ℓ 284, ℓ 285, ℓ 286, ℓ 287, ℓ 288, ℓ 289, ℓ 290.
 Codices Ambrosiani, containing the Gothic language

Gallery

References

Further reading 
 Catalogus codicum graecorum Bibliothecae Ambrosianae (Mediolani 1906) Tomus I
 Catalogus codicum graecorum Bibliothecae Ambrosianae (Mediolani 1906) Tomus II
 
 Biblioteca Ambrosiana website, select English
 Ambrosiana Foundation, U.S. support organization
 Inventory Catalog of Drawings at the Biblioteca Ambrosiana
 http://www.1st-art-gallery.com/Edward-Clifford/Edward-Clifford-oil-paintings.html

External links
Virtual tour of the Biblioteca Ambrosiana provided by Google Arts & Culture

1609 establishments in Italy
Archives in Italy
Libraries in Milan
Culture in Milan
Tourist attractions in Milan
Education in Milan
Libraries established in 1609
Collections of museums in Italy
Art museums and galleries in Milan